Oleuropein is a glycosylated seco-iridoid, a type of phenolic bitter compound found in green olive skin, flesh, seeds, and leaves. The term oleuropein is derived from the botanical name of the olive tree, Olea europaea.

Because of its bitter taste, oleuropein must be completely removed or decomposed to make olives edible. During processing of bitter and inedible green olives for consumption as table olives, oleuropein is removed from olives via a number of methods, including by immersion in lye.

Chemical treatment
Oleuropein is a derivative of elenolic acid linked to the orthodiphenol hydroxytyrosol by an ester bond and to a molecule of glucose by a glycosidic bond. When olives are immersed in a lye solution, the alkaline conditions lead to hydrolysis of the ester bond. The basic conditions also significantly increases the solubility of these derivatives, facilitating their release into the lye solution. 

The high pH accelerates the oxidation of the phenolics, leading to blackness, as during their normal ripening, if the solution is oxygenated by air injection (alkaline oxidation of olives is also called the California process).

The lye solution is replaced several times until the bitter taste has dissipated. An alternative process uses amberlite macroporous resins to trap the oleuropein directly from the solution, reducing waste water while capturing the extracted molecules.

Enzymatic hydrolysis during the maturation of olives is also an important process for the decomposition of oleuropein and elimination of its bitter taste.

Green olive blackening
Green olives may be treated industrially with ferrous gluconate (0.4 wt. %) to change their color to black. Gluconate, an edible oxidation product of glucose, is used as non-toxic reactant to maintain Fe2+ in solution. When in contact with polyphenols, the ferrous ions form a black complex, giving the final color of the treated olives. Black olives treated with iron(II) gluconate are also depleted in hydroxytyrosol, as iron salts are catalysts for its oxidation.

Research 
Oleuropein has been proposed as a proteasome activator.

See also 
 Elenolic acid (a marker for maturation of olives)
 Hydroxytyrosol
 Ligstroside, a closely related compound also found in olives
 Oleocanthal
 Olive leaf
 Olive: Traditional fermentation and curing

References 

Phenylethanoids
Phenol antioxidants
Anti-inflammatory agents
GPER agonists
Phenol glucosides
Phytoestrogens
Olives
Olive oil
Phytochemicals